Dolopius may refer to:
 Dolopius Eschscholtz, 1829, a genus of beetles in the family Elateridae; synonym of Cardiophorus
 Dolopius Dejean, 1833, a genus of beetles in the family Elateridae; synonym of Dalopius